The 2011 American Express – TED open was a professional tennis tournament played on hard courts. It was the 24th edition of the tournament which was part of the 2011 ATP Challenger Tour. It took place in Istanbul, Turkey between 12 and 18 September 2011.

ATP entrants

Seeds

 1 Rankings are as of August 29, 2011.

Other entrants
The following players received wildcards into the singles main draw:
  Haluk Akkoyun
  Filip Horanský
  Philipp Kohlschreiber
  Efe Yurtacan

The following players received entry as an alternate into the singles main draw:
  Evgeny Kirillov

The following players received entry from the qualifying draw:
  Teodor-Dacian Crăciun
  Dimitar Kutrovsky
  Mikhail Ledovskikh (Lucky loser)
  James McGee
  Simon Stadler

Champions

Singles

 Denis Istomin def.  Philipp Kohlschreiber, 7–6(8–6), 6–4

Doubles

 Carsten Ball /  Andre Begemann def.  Grégoire Burquier /  Yannick Mertens, 6–2, 6–4

External links
Official Website
ITF Search
ATP official site

American Express - TED Open
PTT İstanbul Cup
2011 in Turkish tennis